The Amazing Race 21 is the twenty-first season of the American reality television show The Amazing Race. It featured eleven teams of two competing in a race around the world.

The season premiered on CBS on September 30, 2012, and the two-hour season finale aired on December 9, 2012.

The Fabulous Beekman Boys stars and life partners Josh Kilmer-Purcell and Brent Ridge were the winners of this season, while Chippendales dancers Jaymes Vaughan and James Davis finished in second place, and dating couple Trey Wier and Lexi Beerman finished in third.

Production

Development and filming

Season 21 was broadcast during the 2012 fall season on CBS.

This season introduced the "Double Your Money" prize. The team who won the first leg would have been eligible to win a total of $2 million if they ultimately won the race. Elise Doganieri, co-executive producer for the show, called the larger potential prize "a real game-changer". While teams reacted with excitement at the larger prize, Doganieri hoped that if it were won, the additional prize money would be used for "something wonderful" such as supporting charitable medical research. Abbie Ginsberg and Ryan Danz, the winners of the Double Your Money prize, were eliminated from the competition at the conclusion of the ninth leg.

Leg 3 featured the series' first-ever Blind Double U-Turn, where two teams could U-Turn another team, and whichever team used the U-Turn remained anonymous.

Although contestants are typically forbidden contact with family and friends during the filming (except where such contact was part of a task), James LoMenzo was shown video chatting with his wife during the fourth pit stop in order to receive an update on his father's medical condition.

On Leg 7 in Moscow, James & Abba left their bags, which included the latter's passport, in a waiting gypsy cab, but the cab drove off with their bags while James & Abba performed the task. They continued the leg, but before they could check in, they had to try to find Abba's passport to continue the race. Ultimately, they ended the leg in last place, which was a non-elimination leg, but if they were required to leave the country in a subsequent leg, they would be automatically disqualified. The next leg remained in Russia, but they ended up in last after spending time again searching for the passport and were eliminated. As production continued, the two had to secure an exit visa for Abba in lieu of a valid passport. According to Abba, the events of these legs occurred on the Friday and Saturday prior to a major Russian holiday, and it became difficult to work through the limited bureaucracy to do this. The two were fortunate enough that Abba's prior fame was recognized by an employee at the U.S. Embassy, and they were able to secure the visa in time to fly back to the United States on the day prior to the finale.

Cast

This season's cast included The Fabulous Beekman Boys stars Josh Kilmer-Purcell and Brent Ridge, former White Lion and Megadeth metal bassist James LoMenzo, Chippendales dancers Jaymes Vaughan and James Davis, double amputee professional snowboarder Amy Purdy, and former The Apprentice: Martha Stewart contestant Ryan Danz.

Future appearances
Natalie and Nadiya Anderson were selected to return for The Amazing Race: All-Stars. They later competed on Survivor: San Juan del Sur, making them the first Amazing Race contestants to compete on another CBS reality show. On May 23, 2016, Natalie appeared on a Survivor-themed primetime special of The Price is Right. Natalie then returned to compete on Survivor: Winners at War, and Nadiya also made an appearance as part of the loved ones visit. Natalie also competed on the thirty-sixth season of the MTV reality show The Challenge, but had to withdraw in the fifth episode after learning that she was pregnant.

Amy Purdy later competed in the eighteenth season of the ABC reality series Dancing with the Stars. On June 9, 2014, Purdy appeared on CBS's The Price Is Right as a guest model. On April 1, 2016, Purdy appeared on TLC's Say Yes to the Dress. She later also appeared in the 2016 Summer Paralympics opening ceremony where she danced with a robotic arm.

Results
The following teams are listed with their placements in each leg. Placements are listed in finishing order. 
A  placement with a dagger indicates that the team was eliminated. 
An  placement with a double-dagger indicates that the team was the last to arrive at a pit stop in a non-elimination leg, and had to perform a Speed Bump task in the following leg. 
 A  indicates that the team won the Fast Forward. 
 A  indicates that the team used an Express Pass on that leg to bypass one of their tasks.
 A  indicates that the team used the U-Turn and a  indicates the team on the receiving end of the U-Turn.

Notes

Race summary

Leg 1 (United States → China)

Episode 1: "Double Your Money" (September 30, 2012)
Prize: The Double Your Money prize (awarded to Abbie & Ryan)
Eliminated: Rob & Sheila
Locations
Pasadena, California (Colorado Street Bridge) (Starting Line)
 Los Angeles → Shanghai, China
Shanghai (Yuanshen Sports Centre Stadium) 
Shanghai (Cui Ping Jiu Jia Restaurant) 
Shanghai (The Bund)
Shanghai (Bund Signal Tower) 
Episode summary
At the Colorado Street Bridge, teams had to rappel ten stories down the side of the bridge in order to retrieve their first clue, which identified their first destination: Shanghai, China. Teams then drove to Los Angeles International Airport and booked one of two flights to Shanghai, with only seven teams able to make the China Airlines flight and the remaining four teams arriving 75 minutes later via EVA Air. Once in Shanghai, teams had to make their way to the Yuanshen Sports Centre Stadium, where they found their next clue.
 In this season's first Roadblock, one team member had to score one point in a game of table tennis against a 10-year-old Chinese national champion in order to receive their next clue. For each attempt after the racers' first match, the champion played with ordinary household objects, such as a clipboard, frying pan, or tambourine, instead of a paddle.
After completing the Roadblock, teams had to make their way to Cui Ping Jiu Jia Restaurant in order to find their next clue.
 In this leg's second Roadblock, the team member who did not perform the previous Roadblock had to eat two servings of a Chinese dessert known as hasma, consisting of the fatty connective tissue around a frog's fallopian tubes served in two hollowed-out papaya halves, using only a provided pair of chopsticks and without lifting the papaya off the table, in order to receive their next clue.
After the second Roadblock, teams had to travel to The Bund and search the promenade for a woman and boy with traditional Suanpan abaci, who gave them their next clue directing them to the pit stop: the Bund Signal Tower in Shanghai.
Additional tasks
Abbie & Ryan received the Double Your Money prize for winning the first leg. Had they won The Amazing Race, the grand prize would have been doubled from US$1 million to US$2 million. Since they did not win the race, the grand prize at the end remained at US$1 million.

Leg 2 (China → Indonesia)

Episode 2: "Long Hair, Don't Care" (October 7, 2012)
Prize: Express Pass (awarded to Natalie & Nadiya)
Eliminated: Amy & Daniel
Locations
Shanghai (Bund Signal Tower) 
 Shanghai → Surabaya, Indonesia
Bangkalan (Alun-Alun Bangkalan)
Surabaya (Genteng Kali Bridge)
Surabaya (Ekspresi Park) 
Surabaya (Wijaya Motor Shop)
Surabaya (Tirta Maya Ice Factory & Pabean Fish Market  Pabean Fish Market) 
Surabaya (Pabean Market ) 
Episode summary
At the beginning of this leg, teams were instructed to fly to Surabaya, Indonesia. Once in Surabaya, teams traveled across the Suramadu Bridge to an alun-alun stadium in Bangkalan on the island of Madura. Teams picked up a numbered bullwhip that reflected their order in a traditional karapan sapi bull race, with the teams riding on motorcycles alongside the bulls before receiving their next clue. Teams were directed to the Genteng Kali Bridge, where they found their next clue.
 In this leg's Roadblock, one team member had to select four children and operate a pedal-powered ride known as an odong-odong while making eight pieces of balloon art for the children in order to receive their next clue.
After completing the Roadblock, teams had to make their way to the Wijaya Motor Shop in order to find their next clue.
 This season's first Detour was a choice between Ice By The Pound or Fish By The Barrel. In Ice By The Pound, teams had to load ten  blocks of ice from an industrial machine onto a waiting truck, ride the truck to a local market, and then transport the ice by cart to an unloading zone in order to receive their next clue. In Fish By The Barrel, teams had to carry two barrels of fish to a vacant fishmonger's stall inside the Pabean Fish Market. They then had to set up the stall using a display stall as an example, including breaking a block of ice into chips to keep the fish cold, in order to receive their next clue.
Teams had to check in at the pit stop: the main entrance of the fish market.

Leg 3 (Indonesia)

Episode 3: "There's No Crying in Baseball" (October 14, 2012)
Prize: A trip for two to Tokoriki, Fiji (awarded to Abbie & Ryan)
Eliminated: Caitlin & Brittany
Locations
Surabaya (Pabean Market ) 
Surabaya (Antika Jaya Padang Restaurant) 
 Surabaya → Bangil 
 Bangil (Alun-Alun Bangil) 
Bangil (Perliman POS. I) 
Bangil (State Senior High School 1 of Bangil – Greenhouse) 
Episode summary
At the beginning of this leg, teams had to make their way to the Antika Jaya Padang Restaurant in Surabaya, where they found their next clue.
 In this leg's Roadblock, one team member had to serve a hidang-style meal by carrying twenty dishes of food, all at once, to a table of waiting diners without dropping any in order to receive their next clue.
Teams were instructed to travel by train to Bangil; while on the train, teams had to watch for their next clue, which was carried by a food vendor.
 This leg's Detour was a choice between Lion's Head or Egg Head. For both tasks, teams had to travel by becak to Alun-Alun Kota Bangil. In Lion's Head, teams had to walk along a procession route while performing a reog dance, which involved following dance instructions while wearing a  lion's head mask over their heads and shoulders, in order to receive their next clue. In Egg Head, teams had to purchase four eggs from a local market and then participate in a debus: a show of strength where local magicians lit a coconut half on fire atop each team member's head and used the fire to fry the eggs. Teams then had to eat the cooked eggs with a serving of hot sauce in order to receive their next clue.
Teams had to check in at the pit stop: the greenhouse of State Senior High School 1 of Bangil.
Additional notes
 At the Blind Double U-Turn, Rob & Kelley chose to use the U-Turn on Gary & Will. Not knowing which team used the U-Turn on them, Gary & Will chose to use the second U-Turn on Rob & Kelley, who had already passed and were therefore unaffected.

Leg 4 (Indonesia → Bangladesh)

Episode 4: "Funky Monkey" (October 21, 2012)
Prize: A trip for two to Antigua (awarded to James & Abba)
Eliminated: Gary & Will
Locations
Bangil (State Senior High School 1 of Bangil – Greenhouse) 
 Surabaya → Dhaka, Bangladesh
Dhaka (Rubel Model Auto Mobiles)  
Dhaka (Kawran Bazar Shootkir Market) 
 Keranigonj → Dhaka (Old Dhaka – Swarighat)
Dhaka (Old Dhaka – Shyambazar Chan Mia Ghat) 
Episode summary
At the beginning of this leg, teams were instructed to fly to Dhaka, Bangladesh. Once in Dhaka, teams had to make their way to Rubel Model Auto Mobiles, where they found their next clue.
 In this leg's Roadblock, one team member had to repair one of the Dhaka public transit buses. First, they had to use putty to fill in a damaged section and then sand it for painting. Once approved by a supervisor, they had to carry three pairs of seats to the refurbishing area in order to receive their next clue.
 For this season's first Fast Forward, one team had to fill a bag with dead rats, collecting them from three different locations. James & Abba won the Fast Forward.
After completing the Roadblock, teams had to travel to the Kawran Bazar Shootkir Market, where they had to search through hundreds of dried fish to find one marked with Amazing Race colors in order to receive their next clue.
 This leg's Detour was a choice between Pound the Metal or Pound the Cotton. In Pound the Metal, teams had to hand-pump the bellows of a charcoal fire to heat an iron rod and then use sledgehammers to hammer the rod into a sharp spiked tool called a chheny in order to receive their next clue. In Pound the Cotton, teams had to make a cotton mattress via a traditional Bengali method. Teams had to use bamboo rods to beat clumps of cotton into a fine consistency. They then had to stuff the mattress and sew it together in order to receive their next clue.
After completing the Detour, teams had to travel by boat to Swarighat and then go on foot to the pit stop at Shyambazar Chan Mia Ghat in Old Dhaka.

Leg 5 (Bangladesh)

Episode 5: "Chill Out, Freak" (October 28, 2012)
Prize: A trip for two to Langkawi, Malaysia (awarded to James & Abba)
Locations
Dhaka (Old Dhaka – Shyambazar Chan Mia Ghat) 
Dhaka (Sadarghat)
Dhaka (Jatrabari Boro Bazar)
Demra (Ferry Ghat Road) 
Demra (Latif Bawani Jute Mill)  Tarabo (Tarabo Bazar & Shabnam Oil Mill) 
Sonargaon (Lok Shilpa Jadughar) 
Episode summary
At the beginning of this leg, teams had to find a marked taxi stand at Sadarghat and then travel to the Jatrabari Boro Bazar. There, teams had to find the bēguna vendor, which teams had to figure out was the Bengali word for "eggplant", who had their next clue.
 In this leg's Roadblock, one team member had to construct a balance scale from provided bamboo, lashing ropes, and other equipment. Once the scale was approved, racers had to weigh out the proper amount of wood to balance four large stones in order to receive their next clue.
 This leg's Detour was a choice between two forms of Bengali labor: Straw Dogs or Bamboo Jungle. In Straw Dogs, teams had to push a load of unprocessed jute straw to a sorting facility, prepare twenty coils by heckling (throwing them against a nailed board to straighten and separate the fibers), deliver a bundle of completed straw to the mill, and then proceed to the looms at the end of the production line in order to receive their next clue: a jute mat with a painting on it. In Bamboo Jungle, teams had to collect forty bamboo poles of different length and diameter from a storage area at the Tarabo Bazar and then use a platformed cargo bike to transport the bamboo to the Shabnam Oil Mill in order to receive their next clue: a small length of bamboo with a painting on it. The painting on both clues depicted the pit stop: the Lok Shilpa Jadughar in Sonargaon.
Additional notes
Bangladeshi model Rumana Malik Munmun appeared as the pit stop greeter during this leg.
This was a non-elimination leg.

Leg 6 (Bangladesh → Turkey)

Episode 6: "Get Your Sexy On" (November 4, 2012)
Prize: A trip for two to Gold Coast, Australia (awarded to Trey & Lexi)
Eliminated: Rob & Kelley
Locations
Sonargaon (Lok Shilpa Jadughar) 
 Dhaka → Istanbul, Turkey
 Istanbul (Kabataş → Üsküdar)
Istanbul (Mısır Çarşısı)
Istanbul (New Mosque) 
Istanbul (Simit Bakery  Ayasofya Hürrem Sultan Hamamı) 
Istanbul (Kapalıçarşı) 
Istanbul (Kuruçeşme Cemil Topuzlu Parkı – MV Savarona) 
Episode summary
At the beginning of this leg, teams were instructed to fly to Istanbul, Turkey. Once in Istanbul, teams had to make their way to the Kabataş Ferry Terminal, where their clue stated, "Welcome to Europe! Now Make Your Way Back to Asia", and instructed them to travel by ferry to Üsküdar on the Asian side of Istanbul in order to find their next clue.
At the Mısır Çarşısı spice bazaar, teams had to find Stall No. 14, where they received their next clue along with a box of Turkish delight.
 For their Speed Bump, Josh & Brent had to each eat one cone of Maraş ice cream from a nearby stall, which included a teasing performance common with the dessert by the vendor, before they could continue racing.
 This leg's Detour was a choice between Simit or Scrub It. In Simit, teams had to deliver three orders of traditional Turkish bagels known as simits to three different vendors, stacked carefully on a delivery board that one team member had to balance on their head, and also receive proof of delivery from each vendor in order to receive their next clue. In Scrub It, teams had to pick up bathing items from a stall at the Mısır Çarşısı and then travel to a bathhouse, where they received a traditional Turkish bath, after which they received their next clue.
After completing the Detour, teams traveled to the Kapalıçarşı Grand Bazaar, where they found their next clue.
 In this leg's Roadblock, one team member had to serve forty glasses of Turkish sherbet to passersby in the bazaar in order to receive their next clue.
Teams had to check in at the pit stop: the MV Savarona, the presidential yacht of Turkey, docked at the Kuruçeşme Cemil Topuzlu Parkı in Istanbul.

Leg 7 (Turkey → Russia)

Episode 7: "Off to See the Wizard" (November 11, 2012)
Prize: A trip for two to Maui, Hawaii (awarded to Trey & Lexi)
Locations
Istanbul (Kuruçeşme Cemil Topuzlu Parkı – MV Savarona) 
 Istanbul → Moscow, Russia
Moscow (Zurab Tsereteli Sculpture Park) 
Moscow (Moskvoretsky Bridge)
Moscow (Trud Sports Complex  Russian State Library) 
Moscow (Luzhkov Bridge  – Trees of Love) 
Moscow (Bolshoi Theatre) 
Episode summary
At the beginning of this leg, teams were instructed to fly to Moscow, Russia. Once in Moscow, teams had to travel to the Zurab Tsereteli sculpture park, and then to the Moskvoretsky Bridge near the Kremlin, where they had to find two of Ivan the Terrible's guards, who gave them their next clue.
 This leg's Detour was a choice between Synchronized or Alphabetized. In Synchronized, teams had to correctly perform a synchronized swimming routine with six other swimmers from the Russian national team in order to receive their next clue. In Alphabetized, teams went to the Russian State Library and were given a list of books. They had to use the paper card catalog system, written in Cyrillic, to find the locations of four of the books on the list. A librarian then allowed them to search the aisles for the books, which they had to give to the head librarian in exchange for their next clue. For both Detour tasks, there was a time limit depending on the operating hours of each facility. If teams could not complete either task before the facilities closed, they would incur a four-hour penalty.
After completing the Detour, teams had to travel to the Luzhkov Bridge in order to find their next clue.
 In this leg's Roadblock, one team member had to select one of the marked Trees of Love – trees covered in love locks – and unlock ten locks with a provided set of keys in order to free a ribbon from the tree that held their next clue: a 100 ruble banknote.
Teams had to figure out that they had to head to the location on the reverse of the 100 ruble banknote in order to find the pit stop: the Bolshoi Theatre.
Additional notes
This was a non-elimination leg.
James & Abba were not allowed to check in at the pit stop because Abba's passport was amongst the items stolen by their taxicab driver during the Roadblock. However, as this was a non-elimination leg, they were allowed to continue racing until the time came that they would need their passports to travel.

Leg 8 (Russia)

Episode 8: "We Was Robbed" (November 18, 2012)
Prize: A trip for two to Costa Rica (awarded to Jaymes & James)
Eliminated: James & Abba
Locations
Moscow (Bolshoi Theatre) 
Moscow (Moscow Timiryazev Agricultural Academy)  
Moscow (Hotel National) 
Moscow (Sokolniki Park – Tantsev Veranda) 
Episode summary
At the beginning of this leg, teams had to make their way to the Moscow Timiryazev Agricultural Academy, where teams found their next clue.
 In this leg's Roadblock, one team member was shown a brief slideshow showing a sample time in Moscow and a map of Russia's different time zones with their UTC offsets and Moscow's location highlighted. They were then shown multiple instances of the same time zone map without the UTC offsets, but with several other Russian cities highlighted. Afterwards, they had to fill in the corresponding local time for any of the five cities within an allotted time period. If they completed the quiz correctly and on time, they received their next clue. If they were incorrect or ran out of time, they had to watch the presentation again before being able to retake the quiz. 
 For their Speed Bump, James & Abba had to help a Russian Orthodox priest get to his church via limousine. However, this task was not described by Phil on air because James & Abba had fallen so far behind the other teams by that point.
 This leg's Detour was a choice between Movers or Shakers. In Movers, teams had to dress as Russian soldiers and then correctly perform the steps of the Trepak dance in order to receive their next clue. In Shakers, teams attended a party where several impersonators of Russian historical figures were in attendance. They had to identify seven specific historical figures and correctly fill out a form in order to receive their next clue.
Teams had to check in at the pit stop: the Tantsev Veranda in Sokolniki Park.
Additional notes
Natalie & Nadiya used their Express Pass to bypass the Roadblock on this leg.
Since they spent most of the leg trying to either retrieve Abba's passport or acquire a new one, James & Abba were only shown retrieving the Speed Bump clue and traveling to the task before arriving at the pit stop for elimination. Abba revealed in interviews that he completed the Roadblock, but that they did not perform the Detour as they were too far behind the other teams and instead went directly to the pit stop for elimination.

Leg 9 (Russia → Netherlands)

Episode 9: "Fishy Kiss" (November 25, 2012)
Prize:  each (awarded to Natalie & Nadiya)
Eliminated: Abbie & Ryan
Locations
Moscow (Swissôtel Krasnye Holmy) 
 Moscow → Amsterdam, Netherlands
 Amsterdam (Amsterdam Centraal Railway Station)
Amsterdam (Van Gogh Café – The Floating Dutchman) 
 Amsterdam (Herenmarkt → Magere Brug – Pofertjesboot )
Amsterdam (De Duif  Canal Bridges) 
Amsterdam (Museum Geelvinck) 
Ransdorp (Rural Village Field) 
Ransdorp (House of Rembrandt's Mistress) 
Episode summary
At the beginning of this leg, teams were simply given a flag and told to travel to the capital city of the country whose national flag they were given. They had to figure out that it was the flag of the Netherlands and their next destination was Amsterdam. Once in Amsterdam, teams had to take a train to the Amsterdam Centraal railway station, where they found their next clue.
 For this season's second Fast Forward, teams had to travel to the Van Gogh Café and board a marked amphibious bus called The Floating Dutchman. Once the bus entered the water, teams learned that each team member had to eat five soused herring before the bus returned to land. Natalie & Nadiya won the Fast Forward.
At the Herenmarkt, teams had to board a boat that took them to a pofertjesboot, a floating poffertjes stand, near the Magere Brug, where they received their next clue and a serving of poffertjes.
 This leg's Detour was a choice between Back in Time or Organ to Grind. In Back in Time, teams had to re-create Rembrandt's painting The Night Watch using costumed actors and props, including themselves, in order to receive their next clue. In Organ to Grind, teams had to operate one of three Dutch street organs with one team member running the organ while the other asked for tips until they earned  in order to receive their next clue.
After completing the Detour, teams had to travel to the Museum Geelvinck in order to find their next clue, which directed teams had to travel by bus to Ransdorp. After 6:00 p.m., teams that were still racing were allowed to travel by taxi instead of by bus.
 The Roadblock was a Switchback from season 12, where one team member participated in the sport of fierljeppen. They had to vault across an irrigation ditch without hitting the water, retrieve their clue in the form of wooden clogs on the other side, and then vault back across.
Teams had to check in at the pit stop: the house of Rembrandt's mistress in Ransdorp.
Additional notes
 At the Double U-Turn, Jaymes & James chose to use the U-Turn on Abbie & Ryan. Trey & Lexi then used the second U-Turn on Jaymes & James, whom Trey & Lexi knew were ahead of them and were therefore unaffected, thereby preventing other teams from being able to use the second U-Turn.

Leg 10 (Netherlands → Spain)

Episode 10: "Not a Well-Rounded Athlete" (December 2, 2012)
Prize: A trip for two to the Riviera Maya in Mexico (awarded to Trey & Lexi)
Locations
Ransdorp (House of Rembrandt's Mistress) 
 Amsterdam → Barcelona, Spain
 Barcelona → Palma
Palma (Palma Cathedral)
Manacor (Centro de Alto Rendimiento) 
Campanet (Coves de Campanet )
Sa Pobla (Windmill)  Muro (Plaza de Toros la Monumental) 
Palma (Bellver Castle) 
Episode summary
At the beginning of this leg, teams were instructed to fly to Barcelona, Spain. Once in Barcelona, teams had to book an overnight ferry to Palma on the island of Mallorca. After docking in Palma, teams had to make their way to the Palma Cathedral, where they had to search amongst a small troupe of actors dressed as demons participating in a performance for La Nit del Foc, a traditional Mallorcan festival, for the one with their next clue. Teams were instructed to drive themselves to the Centro de Alto Rendimiento in order to find their next clue.
 In this leg's Roadblock, which paid tribute to Mallorcan tennis player Rafael Nadal, one team member had to return twenty tennis balls fired by an automatic server within the bounds of a clay court in order to receive their next clue. If the machine ran out of tennis balls, team members had to start over.
After completing the Roadblock, teams had to make their way to the Coves de Campanet, where they had to follow the music of two guitarists in the caves in order to receive their next clue.
 This leg's Detour was a choice between Spin It or Bull It. In Spin It, teams had to don safety gear and replace two blades on a 400-year-old Mallorcan windmill to the satisfaction of a mechanic before receiving their next clue. In Bull It, teams wore a special two-person bull outfit, with the person in front unable to see where they were going. The team member in back had to verbally guide their partner in the front to circle eight matadors and then strike a target within two minutes in order to receive their next clue.
Teams had to check in at the pit stop: Bellver Castle in Palma.
Additional notes
This was a non-elimination leg.

Leg 11 (Spain → France)

Episode 11: "Take Down That Million" (December 9, 2012)
Prize: A 2013 Ford Escape for each racer (awarded to Jaymes & James)
Eliminated: Natalie & Nadiya
Locations
Palma (Bellver Castle) 
 Palma → Barcelona
 Barcelona → Saint-Pierre-des-Corps, France
Villandry (Château de Villandry) 
Amboise (Château d'Amboise – Chapel of Saint-Hubert)
Cheverny (Château de Cheverny) 
Bourré (La Cave des Roches) 
Chenonceaux (Château de Chenonceau) 
Episode summary
At the beginning of this leg, teams were instructed to fly back to Barcelona, and then travel by train to Saint-Pierre-des-Corps, France. Outside the train station in Saint-Pierre-des-Corps, teams had to load eight empty baskets from a nearby restaurant into their vehicle before heading to the Château de Villandry. There, teams had to search the château's gardens for the statue of a stone dog, where they found their next clue, which instructed them to find Leonardo da Vinci's grave. Teams had to figure out that this was at the chapel of the Château d'Amboise, where they found their next clue.
 For their Speed Bump, Natalie & Nadiya had to properly lace and tie up a lady's corset at the Château de Villandry before they could continue racing.
 This season's final Detour was a choice between Plow or Chow. In Plow, teams had to use a plow attached to a workhorse to till four straight furrows in a field in order to receive their next clue. In Chow, teams had to prepare a meal for a large pack of hunting dogs. They had to cut the meat into appropriate sizes, weigh out  of dog food, and then lay it out appropriately before the judge released the hounds and gave them their next clue.
After completing the Detour, teams had to travel to La Cave des Roches in Bourré, where they found their next clue.
 In this leg's Roadblock, one team member had to memorize three types of mushrooms in a store display. Then, using one of the baskets they picked up at the train station, they had to enter a dimly-lit underground mushroom farm, find the same three types of mushrooms, and collect ten of each variety in order to receive their next clue.
After completing the Roadblock, teams were directed to go to the pit stop at the "Castle of the Ladies", and had to figure out that this was the Château de Chenonceau.

Leg 12 (France → United States)

Episode 11: "Take Down That Million" (December 9, 2012)
Winners: Josh & Brent
Second Place: Jaymes & James
Third Place: Trey & Lexi
Locations
Chenonceaux (Château de Chenonceau) 
 Paris → New York City, New York
New York City (Coney Island – Riegelmann Boardwalk)
New York City (Brooklyn Navy Yard) 
New York City (Lombardi's Pizza)
New York City (United Nations Headquarters) 
New York City (Gotham Hall) 
Episode summary
At the beginning of this leg, teams were given a postcard depicting a particular view at Coney Island in Brooklyn, and were instructed to fly to New York City. At Coney Island, teams had to find the exact location shown in the photo, and their next clue was printed on advertisements nearby.
 In this leg's first Roadblock, one team member was put into a straitjacket and bungee harness and hoisted upside down 15 stories above the Brooklyn Navy Yard. They then had to escape the bonds of the straitjacket, after which they were dropped in a surprise bungee drop. After being lowered to the ground, teams were given their next clue.
After completing the first Roadblock, teams were instructed to go to the first pizzeria in New York: Lombardi's Pizza in Manhattan. There, teams had to deliver ten pizzas with various toppings to three different addresses in Little Italy without taking any notes. Once teams delivered all three orders, they were given a blue badge emblazoned with a logo, which they had to figure out was the logo for the United Nations and that their next clue was at the UN Headquarters.
 In this season's final Roadblock, the team member who did not perform the previous Roadblock had to attach the words for "hello" and "goodbye", as said to them by the pit stop greeters in their native languages, for the eight foreign countries visited during the race and raise them up the flagpole flying that country's flag. Once all of the flag sets were correct, they could then hoist the flag of the United Nations, which also lowered their final clue, directing teams to the finish line at Gotham Hall.
{| class="wikitable unsortable" style="text-align:left;"
! scope="col" |Country
! scope="col" |Language
! scope="col" |Hello
! scope="col" |Goodbye
|-
! scope="row" style=text-align:left |
|Mandarin
| 
| 
|-
! scope="row" style=text-align:left |
|Indonesian
| 
| 
|-
! scope="row" style=text-align:left |
|Bengali
| 
| 
|-
! scope="row" style=text-align:left |
|Turkish
| 
| 
|-
! scope="row" style=text-align:left |
|Russian
| 
| 
|-
! scope="row" style=text-align:left |
|Dutch
| 
| 
|-
! scope="row" style=text-align:left |
|Spanish
| 
| 
|-
! scope="row" style=text-align:left |
|French
| 
| 
|}
Additional notes
Legs 11 and 12 aired back-to-back as a special two-hour episode.

Reception

Critical response
The Amazing Race 21 received mixed reviews. Daniel Fienberg of HitFix wrote that "it was a decent season. There were some good challenges in some good cities and as we got to the Final Four, I had at least one team I was rooting for and at least one team I was rooting against" but said that the cast wasn't the strongest saying that looking "back at the six teams that were eliminated first and that's a lot of filler". Carrie Milburn of Reality Nation called the story arc of this season's winners inspiring. Michael Hewitt of the Orange County Register called this season's ending "the biggest upset in 'TAR' history, but that upset meant two stronger and more likable teams were shut out of the prize money." In 2016, this season was ranked 23rd out of the first 27 seasons by the Rob Has a Podcast Amazing Race correspondents.

Ratings
U.S. Nielsen ratings

Episode 8, "We Was Robbed", went up against the 2012 American Music Awards.
The season 21 finale was down 31% from the season 19 fall finale on December 11, 2011. It tied as the show's lowest rated finale ever.

Canadian ratings
Canadian broadcaster CTV also aired The Amazing Race on Sundays. Episodes aired at 8:00 p.m. Eastern and Central (9:00 p.m. Pacific, Mountain and Atlantic).

Episode 2, "Long Hair, Don't Care", aired on the Sunday before Canadian Thanksgiving Day.
Episode 9, "Fishy Kiss", aired on the day of the 100th Grey Cup.

References

External links
 

 21
2012 American television seasons
Television shows filmed in California
Television shows filmed in Shanghai
Television shows filmed in Hong Kong
Television shows filmed in Indonesia
Television shows filmed in Bangladesh
Television shows filmed in Turkey
Television shows filmed in Germany
Television shows filmed in Russia
Television shows filmed in the Netherlands
Television shows filmed in Spain
Television shows filmed in France
Television shows filmed in New York City